Shirin Kanchwala is an Indian model and actress who primarily works in Tamil films. She is best known for Tamil movie Nenjamundu Nermaiyundu Odu Raja produced by actor Sivakarthikeyan.

Early life 
Shirin Kanchwala was born in Mumbai, Maharashtra, India. She worked as an Air Hostess with Jet Airways for 3 years.

Career 
After gaining an interest in modelling and acting, Kanchwala quit Jet Airways and focused on modelling and acting. She played the lead role in her debut Kannada movie Viraaj in 2018. In 2019, she made her debut in Tamil film industry with Nenjamundu Nermaiyundu Odu Raja with Rio Raj. Currently, she is playing the lead role "Rajee" in the Tamil movie Walter alongside Sibiraj. She is scheduled to play the lead role in actor Santhanam's next film Dikkiloona.

Filmography

References

External links 

Living people
21st-century Indian actresses
Actresses in Tamil cinema
Actresses in Kannada cinema
Indian film actresses
Actresses from Mumbai
Female models from Mumbai
1995 births